The 1975 Texas A&I Javelinas football team was an American football team that represented the Texas College of Arts and Industries (now known as Texas A&M University–Kingsville) as a member of the Lone Star Conference during the 1975 NAIA Division I football season. In its 22nd year under head coach Gil Steinke, the team compiled a perfect 12–0 record (9–0 against conference opponents), won the Lone Star Conference championship, and defeated  in the Champion Bowl to win the NAIA national championship.

The team played its home games at Javelina Stadium in Kingsville, Texas.

Schedule

References

Texas AandI
Texas A&M–Kingsville Javelinas football seasons
NAIA Football National Champions
Lone Star Conference football champion seasons
College football undefeated seasons
Texas AandI Javelinas football